Brighton MET is a large general further education college located in Brighton and Hove, It is now part of the Chichester College Group after Greater Brighton Metropolitan College merged with CCG on 1 August 2021. 

It has two campus: Central Brighton Campus, Pelham Street, Brighton and East Brighton Campus, Wilson Avenue, Brighton. It had previously been named City College Brighton & Hove, Brighton College of Technology, Brighton Technical College and Brighton College of Arts and Technology.

The college is a popular choice for visual arts progression from nearby colleges e.g. A-level art and photography courses, and provides academic grounding in workmanships such as woodwork, carpentry, engineering, plumbing and electronics. The technical progressions the college provided gave opportunities for post-GCSE students wishing to pursue a specific profession rather than studying multiple A-levels. The college also supported adult learning for over 21s, including those without existing traditional qualifications but the necessary experience and intentions.

The college embraces media technologies with the introduction of video games related qualifications. Courses syllabuses were regularly updated with new technologies to keep tuition up to date and the most desirable by employers.

Courses

The college offers vocational courses, academic and vocational A-levels, BTEC National and First Diplomas and NVQs, and progression to its own Higher Education courses in conjunction with the University of Brighton.

Students

Two thousand full-time students, and over 9000 part-time, attended the college every year. The students came from varying kinds of social and ethnic backgrounds, including many international students.

College redevelopment
On 11 December 2013 it was announced that plans for the college to be rebuilt were approved by the local planning committees. It was hoped the new building would be more appropriate for teaching, aiding growth in the local area by creating 141 construction jobs. However, the plan was controversial among students, staff and residents. This is partly due to part of the college plot being sold off for housing and many departments being reduced in size.

Awards

The College's carpentry department was awarded a City & Guilds Medal for Excellence eleven times from 1996. The college also achieved the ‘Action for Business Colleges’ (AfBC) accreditation, marking the college’s responsiveness to the needs of the local business community.

In addition the college was also awarded a 'Centre of Vocational Excellence' (CoVE) status in Digital Design, Instrumentation, Automation and Control Engineering, Heritage Engineering, Business, Management and Finance, Hospitality and Tourism.

Alumni
Famous alumni of the college include:

Julie Christie, actress
Chris Collins, Blue Peter gardener
Graham Kerr, chef
Deborah Meaden, business woman
Domenica Lawson, Down's syndrome education activist
Steve Ovett, Olympic Gold Medalist
Dame Flora Robson
Ben McKellar, chef and owner of The Gingerman and Ginger Pig.
Arumugam Vijiaratnam, engineer and Olympic athlete
Navnit Dholakia, Baron Dholakia, Liberal Democrat politician

References

Further education colleges in Sussex
Education in Brighton and Hove
1858 establishments in the United Kingdom
Educational institutions established in 1858